The men's shot put event at the 1999 European Athletics U23 Championships was held in Göteborg, Sweden, at Ullevi on 29 July 1999.

Medalists

Results

Final
29 July

Qualifications
29 July
Qualifying 18.40 or 12 best to the Final

Group A

Group B

Participation
According to an unofficial count, 22 athletes from 19 countries participated in the event.

 (1)
 (1)
 (1)
 (2)
 (1)
 (1)
 (1)
 (1)
 (1)
 (1)
 (1)
 (1)
 (2)
 (1)
 (1)
 (1)
 (2)
 (1)
 (1)

References

Shot put
Shot put at the European Athletics U23 Championships